Herbert Otto Bizer (August 3, 1906 – December 3, 1974) was an American multi-sport athlete, playing both American football and basketball in college. He later played professionaly in the National Football League with the Buffalo Bisons during the 1929 NFL season.

References

1906 births
1974 deaths
American football ends
American men's basketball players
Buffalo Bisons (NFL) players
Carroll Pioneers football players
Carroll Pioneers men's basketball players
People from Mosel, Wisconsin
Players of American football from Wisconsin